Schwendi bei Grindelwald railway station ( is a railway station in the municipality of Grindelwald in the Swiss canton of Bern. The station is on the Berner Oberland Bahn, whose trains operate services to Interlaken Ost and Grindelwald. It takes its name from the nearby settlement of Schwendi.

Services 
 the following services stop at Schwendi bei Grindelwald:

References

External links 
 
 

Railway stations in the canton of Bern
Bernese Oberland Railway stations
Railway stations in Switzerland opened in 1890